QEB Hollis Whiteman is a leading set of barristers' chambers specialising in criminal, financial, and regulatory law, located in the City of London. Established in the 1980s, it employs 70 barristers, including 21 King's Counsel, four Treasury Counsel and one Standing Counsel to the RCPO. The current Heads of Chambers are Selva Ramasamy KC and Adrian Darbishire KC  and the Chief Clerk is Chris Emmings.

History
The set was established in June 1982 by Daniel Hollis QC (1925–2016). It was named after their former premises at Queen Elizabeth Building in the Temple which it left in 2010, moving to the City of London.

Practice areas
The set's practice areas include:

 Regulatory
 Corporate crime and Financial crime
 Fraud
 Crime and Private Prosecution
 Public
 Health and Safety
 Confiscation, Restraint and Cash Forfeiture
 Sport, Media and Entertainment

The chambers are considered "the go-to place" for criminal defence as well as for prosecution.

Notable members
Members of chambers have prosecuted and defended in many widely publicised criminal cases.  
 Mark Ellison KC defended Hogan Lovells solicitor Chris Grierson when he was accused of £1.27 million expenses fraud, as well as prosecuting on behalf of FCA in £7.4m gains insider dealing case. He also undertook a review of undercover policing in connection to Stephen Lawrence murder for the Home Office. 
 Edward Brown KC advised the SFO and leads for the prosecution in the Barclays-Qatar fundraising prosecution, as well as prosecuting Kevin Hutchinson-Foster in connection with Mark Duggan murder. 
 Adrian Darbishire KC successfully defended Ryan Reich who was prosecuted by the Serious Fraud Office for manipulating the London LIBOR during the Libor scandal. 
 Zoe Johnson KC is a former Senior Treasury Counsel and the founding member of the Bar Disability Panel.  
 Peter Kyte KC is a prosecutor who also sits as a recorder at Southwark Crown Court.
 William Boyce KC is a Crown Court Recorder and former Senior Treasury Counsel.
 Eleanor Laws KC is a Recorder and has been described as the "go-to Silk" for sexual offences.
 Tom Kark KC is a Crown Court Recorder and former standing counsel to Customs and Excise. He has been appointed to Chair the Muckamore Abbey Hospital Public Inquiry in Northern Ireland (2022).  He was a leading Counsel to the Francis Inquiry that examined the causes of the failings in care at Mid Staffordshire NHS Foundation Trust between 2005 and 2009. and conducted a review of the fit and proper person test for the Minister for Health published in 2019. He also sits as a legal assessor in the Osteopathic Council.
 Sean Larkin KC successfully prosecuted alleged Daesh sympathiser in a terrorism case which could have long lasting implications on the definition of terrorism and the impact of public international law on domestic legislation.

Notable honorary members
Honorary members include Mr Justice David Calvet-Smith, former Director of Public Prosecutions and former Chair of the Parole Board for England and Wales.

Former notable members
Former members include Daniel Hollis QC, the founding member of the set, and judge Ian Paton QC, criminal prosecutor who prosecuted in major criminal trials as well as sitting as a Recorder in Southwark Crown Court.

Heather Norton practised at the chambers for 23 years, until 2012 when she was appointed a Circuit Judge sitting at Canterbury Crown Court.

Rankings and honours
 In 2016, Chambers and Partners named QEB Hollis Whiteman "Crime Set of The Year". 
 In 2017, Who's Who Legal listed QEB Hollis Whiteman as one of their “leading sets” for crime.
 In 2018, Legal 500 named QEB Hollis Whiteman as “Crime Set of the Year”.

See also

 Criminal justice
 Criminal defence

References

External links

 Website of QEB Hollis Whiteman
 Lucy Kennedy of QEB Hollis Whiteman interviewed about regulatory law
 Dailymotion: QEB Hollis Whiteman move to the City of London
 QEB Hollis Whiteman member Tom Kark QC discusses the Francis Inquiry at a Royal Pharmaceutical Society event

Barristers' chambers in the United Kingdom
1983 establishments in the United Kingdom
Law firms based in London
Law firms of England
Trial lawyers
Public defenders
Criminal defense organizations
Law firms established in 1983
Government lawyers